The 63rd NAIA Men's Division I Basketball Tournament was held in March at the Tulsa Convention Center in Tulsa, Oklahoma. The 63rd annual NAIA basketball tournament featured 32 teams playing in a single-elimination format. The championship game featured Life University and Georgetown College. Life would defeat Georgetown by a score of 63 to 59.

Awards and honors
Leading scorer: Will Carlton, Georgetown (Ky.); 5 games, 37 field goals, 21 free throws, 100 total points (20.0 average points per game)
Leading rebounder: Will Carlton, Georgetown (Ky.); 5 games, 57 total rebounds (11.4 average rebounds per game)
Most consecutive tournament appearances: 9th, Georgetown (Ky.)
Most tournament appearances: Georgetown (Ky.), 19th of 28, appearances to the NAIA Tournament.

2000 NAIA bracket

  * denotes each overtime.

See also
2000 NAIA Division I women's basketball tournament
2000 NCAA Division I men's basketball tournament
2000 NCAA Division II men's basketball tournament
2000 NCAA Division III men's basketball tournament
2000 NAIA Division II men's basketball tournament

References

NAIA Men's Basketball Championship
Tournament
NAIA Division I men's basketball tournament
NAIA Division I men's basketball tournament